USS Edgar F. Coney (SP-346) was an armed tug that served in the United States Navy from 1917 to 1919.

Edgar F. Coney  was built as a commercial steam tug of the same name in 1904 by John B. Dialogue & Sons at Camden, New Jersey, for the South Atlantic Towboat Company. On 22 September 1917, the U.S. Navy chartered her from her owner – by then Philip Shore of Tampa, Florida – for use during World War I. She was commissioned the same day as USS Edgar F. Coney (SP-346).

Assigned to the 3rd Naval District, Edgar F. Coney was based at Tompkinsville, Staten Island, New York. She carried out towing duties in the New York City area for the remainder of World War I and into 1919.

Edgar F. Coney was decommissioned on 5 July 1919 and returned to her owner the same day. She returned to commercial service. The Tug sank 28 January 1930 in the Gulf of Mexico in rough seas and high winds 70 miles south east of Port Arthur, Texas. Lost with all 14 hands.

References

Department of the Navy Naval History and Heritage Command Online Library of Selected Images: Civilian Ships: Edgar F. Coney (American Tug, 1904). Served as USS Edgar F. Coney (SP-346) in 1917–1919
NavSource Online: Section Patrol Craft Photo Archive: Edgar F. Coney (SP 346)

Tugs of the United States Navy
World War I auxiliary ships of the United States
Ships built by Dialogue & Company
1904 ships
Shipwrecks of the Florida coast
Maritime incidents in 1930